Aldair Nascimento dos Santos (born 30 November 1965), known simply as Aldair, is a Brazilian retired footballer who played as a defender, and who was part of the Brazil national team that won the 1994 FIFA World Cup.

Considered as one of Brazil's greatest defenders ever, he spent most of his professional career at Italian club A.S. Roma, where he later also served as captain, winning the Serie A title with the club in 2001. He is one of the members to have been inducted into the A.S. Roma Hall of Fame.

Club career 
Aldair started playing at Flamengo where he won the State Championship Campeonato Carioca in 1986. He moved to Europe in 1989, playing with Benfica, winning the Portuguese Supercup, and reaching the European Cup Final during his only season with the team.

Aldair subsequently moved to A.S. Roma in 1990 and played with this club during 13 seasons, until 2003. He played a total of 436 matches with the Giallorossi, scoring 20 goals in total. During this period he won the Serie A in 2001, one Supercoppa Italiana, and one Coppa Italia in 1991 (also reaching the UEFA Cup Final in the same year). Aldair was recognised in 2000 as one of the best players in the world by being selected in the FIFA XI; still, he remained loyal to Roma in spite of the club not having won any major international honours during his time there.

Due to his long career with Roma, Aldair is currently the most-capped foreign player in the Italian club's history and the club decided to retire his number 6 jersey when he left the team in 2003. However, this retirement was not permanent, as in 2013 the shirt number 6 has been conceded to Kevin Strootman, with Aldair's approval. In 1998, he was chosen to be the captain of the Giallorossi but preferred to grant the armband to the then 22-years old Francesco Totti. For his contribution to the club, Aldair was included into the A.S. Roma Hall of Fame in 2012, and thus recognized as one of the best footballers in the club's history. He was nicknamed "Pluto" by Roma fans.

After Roma, Aldair then briefly joined Genoa CFC. In July 2005, Aldair announced plans of playing for Rio Branco, and played two games for the club in the estadual championship, helping his team to win the title.

Former teammate and good friend Massimo Agostini convinced him to play in San Marino for S.S. Murata in order to boost their Champions League campaign. After Murata's dreadful 7–1 aggregate defeat to Cypriots APOEL in the first round of qualifying for the 2006–07 UEFA Cup, Agostini decided to call upon Aldair to join him on the Italian Peninsula. Aldair took part in the Champions League qualifying stage in July 2007.

International career 
Aldair was part of the Brazilian squad that took part at the 1990 FIFA World Cup. In 1994, he reached the pinnacle of his career when he played for the Brazilian squad that won the 1994 FIFA World Cup. Originally not included in the squad announced on 10 May 1994, he was called up as replacement when Carlos Mozer had to withdraw due to illness. He also played for Brazil in the 1998 World Cup, as Brazil went on to reach the final once again, only to be defeated by France. He took part in three Copa América's with Brazil, winning the title in 1989 and 1997, whilst earning a runners-up medal in 1995. Aldair won a bronze medal at the 1996 Summer Olympics, and was part of the Brazilian team that won the 1997 FIFA Confederations Cup. In addition to these tournaments, Aldair also took part in two friendly tournaments with Brazil, winning the 1995 Umbro Cup, and finishing in second place in the 1997 Tournoi de France. In total, he appeared 81 times for Brazil between 1989 and 2000, scoring three goals.

Style of play 
An elegant and tactically versatile defender, Aldair was capable of playing both as a sweeper and centre back, due to his vision, technical ability and passing range. His confidence on the ball and, in particular, his adeptness at long balls enabled him to advance into midfield and create chances for teammates. Although he was not particularly quick, he was a strong defender who excelled in the air. He also excelled at anticipating opponents with well-timed challenges due to his ability to read the game. In addition to his defensive and technical skills, Aldair was also known for his leadership and sportsmanship throughout his career.

Career statistics

Club career

International

Honours

Club 
Flamengo
 Campeonato Carioca: 1986
 Campeonato Brasileiro Série A: 1987

Benfica
 Portuguese Supercup: 1989

Roma
 Serie A: 2000–01
 Coppa Italia: 1990–91
 Supercoppa Italiana: 2001

Murata
 Campionato Sammarinese di Calcio: 2007–08

International 
Brazil
 FIFA World Cup: 1994; Runner-up 1998
 Copa América: 1989, 1997; Runner-up  1995
 Summer Olympic Games: Bronze medal 1996
 FIFA Confederations Cup: 1997

Individual 
 FIFA XI: 2000
 Golden Foot: 2008, as football legend
 A.S. Roma Hall of Fame: 2012

See also 

 List of athletes who came out of retirement

References

External links 
 
 
 
 
 

1965 births
Living people
Brazilian footballers
Brazilian expatriate footballers
Brazil international footballers
Expatriate footballers in Italy
Expatriate footballers in Portugal
Expatriate footballers in San Marino
CR Flamengo footballers
1989 Copa América players
1995 Copa América players
1997 Copa América players
1990 FIFA World Cup players
1994 FIFA World Cup players
1997 FIFA Confederations Cup players
1998 FIFA World Cup players
Copa América-winning players
FIFA World Cup-winning players
FIFA Confederations Cup-winning players
Association football defenders
Footballers at the 1996 Summer Olympics
A.S. Roma players
S.L. Benfica footballers
Genoa C.F.C. players
Olympic bronze medalists for Brazil
Olympic footballers of Brazil
Campeonato Brasileiro Série A players
Serie A players
Serie B players
Primeira Liga players
S.S. Murata players
Olympic medalists in football
Medalists at the 1996 Summer Olympics
Brazilian expatriate sportspeople in San Marino
Brazilian expatriate sportspeople in Portugal
Brazilian expatriate sportspeople in Italy
People from Ilhéus
Sportspeople from Bahia